Scorching Fury is a 1952 American Western film. It stars Richard Devon, William Leslie and Sherwood Price and was written by Devon and James Craig.

References

External links
 
 Scorching Fury at TCMDB

American Western (genre) films
1952 films
1952 Western (genre) films
American black-and-white films
1950s English-language films
1950s American films